Haliza Hanim Abd Halim (born 19 November 1979) is a Malaysian singer and actress. Starting her musical career in 1997, she has released seven studio albums to date. She won a Best Vocal Award at the 17th edition of Anugerah Juara Lagu.

Life 
Liza Hanim graduated from Sunway College.

She appeared in P. Ramlee The Musical as "Saloma." In 2017, she competed in the fourth season Gegar Vaganza, a reality competition aimed to seasoned singers. 

In 2021, she appeared at the Astro 25 Concert. She was a judge at All Together Now Malaysia.

Family 
In 2003, she married Mohd Shahrin Mohd Samsudin, a former member of Malaysian boy band, Indigo. The couple has five children.

Discography

Studio albums 
 Epilog (1997)
 Di Mana Kan Ku Cari Ganti (1998)
 Puteri Jelmaan (1999)
 Istimewa (2000)
 Isyarat Jiwa (2001)
 Ku Teruskan (2003)
 Imagin (2007)

Compilation albums 
 Molek (1998)
 Srikandi (1999)
 Aidilfitri di Alaf Baru (1999)
 Srikandi 2 (2002)
 Rindu Selalu (2005)

References

External links 
 
 

1979 births
Living people
Malaysian people of Malay descent
Malaysian Muslims
People from Selangor
21st-century Malaysian women singers
Malay-language singers
Malaysian actresses
Malaysian film actresses
Malaysian television actresses
20th-century Malaysian women singers